Ryan Martinez is an American politician who has served in the Oklahoma House of Representatives from the 39th District since 2016. He was indicted for driving under the influence on December 22, 2022.

Early life and education
Martinez was born in Edmond, Oklahoma to a Hispanic-American family. As a child, he attended a private school. He later described how he and other children like him were affected by racism in the United States at school, saying that they were all "labeled as problem children" and "just little brown kids that are probably going to end up drug dealers, prisoners, dead." He later went on to earn his bachelor's of arts in political science from the University of Northern Colorado.

Early career
Martinez worked as a field representative for Senator James Inhofe, served as staff for the Oklahoma House of Representatives during the speakership of T.W. Shannon, and worked as the executive director for the Oklahoma Republican State House Committee. He also worked as vice president of marketing and development for Sagac Public Affairs.

Oklahoma House of Representatives
In June 2016, Martinez won in the Republican primary for the Oklahoma House of Representatives over fellow candidate Michael Buoy, with 68% of the votes. In the general election, Martinez defeating Libertarian candidate Clark Duffe, with 76.49% of the votes.

During his first re-election campaign in 2018, Martinez faced a Republican primary challenger from Denecia Taylor-Cassil. Taylor-Cassil's campaign sent mailers accusing Martinez of being charged with driving under the influence in 2014. He responded to the mailers saying "[I] made a mistake one night in my 20s when a car struck my vehicle, and regrettably, I had a few drinks." The case was later expunged from court records. He defeated Taylor-Cassil with 67% of the primary election.

In 2020, during the aftermath of the 2020 United States presidential election and the attempts to overturn it by former President Donald Trump, Martinez supported Attorney General Mike Hunter's decision to join a brief in support of Texas in the case of Texas v. Pennsylvania, a Supreme Court case challenging election winner Joe Biden's success in the election.

In 2021, Martinez chaired the House Redistricting Committee in charge of redistricting in Oklahoma after the 2020 United States census. He also collaborated with fellow state representative Jose Cruz as well as state senators Michael Brooks and Jessica Garvin to create a bipartisan Latino caucus.

In 2022, Martinez chaired the special investigative committee into the Swadley's BBQ scandal. The same year, Martinez authored a successful bill to tie the number of weeks Oklahomans are eligible for unemployment to the number of Oklahomans applying for unemployment benefits. The bill increases the number of weeks from 16 weeks to up to 26 weeks when unemployment claims are high. Later in the session, Martinez referred to Governor Kevin Stitt's veto of a bill requiring the Oklahoma Department of Public Safety to count convictions in tribal courts when determining driver’s license suspensions as “racist and hateful”. The legislature later overrode Stitt's veto.

Felony indictment
On October 26, 2022, the Edmond Police Department received a 911 call reporting Representative Martinez was drunk at an Edmond bar, The Patriarch, and was about to leave in his vehicle. Police arrived and found him in his car where he was arrested for driving under the influence after he failed a field sobriety test. During the arrest, he allegedly asked officers "Would you like me to call Kevin right now," in reference to Oklahoma Governor Kevin Stitt. On December 22, 2022, The Frontier reported that Representative Martinez had been indicted for felony “Actual Physical Control Of Vehicle While Intoxicated” in Oklahoma County.

Personal life 
Martinez resides with his wife, Katie, in his home city of Edmond. He is a member of Memorial Church of Christ in Edmond.

Electoral history

Martinez was re-elected without opposition in 2020.

Martinez was re-elected without opposition in 2022.

References 

People from Edmond, Oklahoma
Oklahoma Republicans
Living people
Year of birth missing (living people)
Hispanic and Latino American state legislators in Oklahoma
21st-century American politicians